The Chief Minister of Mizoram is the chief executive of the Indian state of Mizoram. As per the Constitution of India, the governor is a state's de jure head, but de facto executive authority rests with the chief minister. Following elections to the Mizoram Legislative Assembly, the state's governor usually invites the party (or coalition) with a majority of seats to form the government. The governor appoints the chief minister, whose council of ministers are collectively responsible to the assembly. Given that he has the confidence of the assembly, the chief minister's term is for five years and is subject to no term limits.

Since 1972, five people from four parties have served as Chief Minister of Mizoram; the inaugural officeholder was C. Chhunga. Lal Thanhawla of the Indian National Congress has the longest incumbency of over 21          years in 5 terms. The current incumbent is Zoramthanga of the Mizo National Front who assumed office on 15 December 2018.

List

Notes
Footnotes

References

External links
 Indian States since 1947

 
Mizoram
Chief Ministers